Julian Vaughan Gary (February 25, 1892 – September 6, 1973) was a U.S. Representative from Virginia.

Biography

Born in Richmond, Virginia, Gary was a graduate of the University of Richmond (B.A., 1912, LL.B., 1915). He was admitted to the bar in 1915 and commenced practice in Richmond, Virginia. Gary served in the United States Army during World War I, and subsequently served as counsel and executive assistant of the Virginia tax board from 1919–1924. From 1926-33, Gary served in the Virginia House of Delegates.
Gary also served as a member of the board of trustees of the University of Richmond.

Gary was elected as a Democrat to the Seventy-ninth Congress by special election, March 6, 1945, to fill the vacancy caused by the resignation of Dave E. Satterfield, Jr. He was reelected to the nine succeeding Congresses and served from March 6, 1945, to January 3, 1965, during which time he was a signatory to the 1956 Southern Manifesto that opposed the desegregation of public schools ordered by the Supreme Court in Brown v. Board of Education. He was not a candidate for renomination in 1964 to the Eighty-ninth Congress, and he subsequently resumed this private law practice in Richmond. Upon his retirement, Gary continued to reside in Richmond, where he died September 6, 1973. He is buried in Hollywood Cemetery.

Electoral history
1945; Gary was elected to the U.S. House of Representatives with 48.55% of the vote, defeating fellow Democrat Ashton Dovell and Republican Curtis M. dozier.
1946; Re-elected with 73.35% of the vote, defeating Republican Earle Lutz.
1948; Re-elected with 72.94% of the vote, defeating Republican Richard C. Poage, Independent David P. Bennett, and Socialist Mary D. Fleet.
1950; Re-elected with 89.73% of the vote, defeating Independent Phronia A. McNeill and Social Democrat Kathryn Bernstein.
1952; Re-elected with 57.67% of the vote, defeating Republican Walter R. Gambill.
1954; Re-elected with 58.01% of the vote, defeating Republican J. Calvitt Clarke.
1956; Re-elected with 59.07% of the vote, defeating Republican Royal E. Cabell.
1958; Re-elected with 76.14% of the vote, defeating Republican Richard R. Ryder.
1960; Re-elected with 78.02% of the vote, defeating Independent Thomas Coleman Andrews, Jr.
1962; Re-elected with 49.8% of the vote, defeating Republican Louis H. Williams and Independent Alfred T. Dudley.

Sources

1892 births
1973 deaths
Politicians from Richmond, Virginia
Military personnel from Richmond, Virginia
Democratic Party members of the Virginia House of Delegates
University of Richmond alumni
University of Richmond School of Law alumni
Virginia lawyers
Burials at Hollywood Cemetery (Richmond, Virginia)
United States Army personnel of World War I
Democratic Party members of the United States House of Representatives from Virginia
20th-century American politicians
20th-century American lawyers